"Rescue Party" is a science fiction short story by English writer Arthur C. Clarke, first published in Astounding Science Fiction in May 1946. It was the first story that he sold, though not the first one published.  It was republished in Clarke's second collection, Reach for Tomorrow (1956), and also appears in The Collected Stories of Arthur C. Clarke (2001).

Plot summary 

The story begins with a ship full of aliens visiting Earth only hours before the Sun will explode, destroying the planet. The mission of the aliens is to try to save as many people and as much of the culture as possible. Normally the galactic civilization does surveys of planets every one million years for new species, but the human race did not exist the last time the survey was done – four hundred thousand years before. However, radio signals had been detected on a planet 200 light years away, indicating intelligent life had arisen.

To the aliens' surprise, the planet seems to be empty of intelligent life, except for the remnants of a civilization. While the aliens explore the old cities, we find out that it is  typical for species to take thousands of years to develop from radio to space travel.

During their exploration of Earth, the aliens find a communication tower beaming into space. At the end of the story, they follow the beam and find an enormous fleet of human ships, powered by rockets. The aliens, equipped with faster-than-light ships, are amazed that humans dared to cross interstellar space with rockets, having done so only 200 years after inventing radio.  Humans do not possess faster-than-light ships, but in order to survive as a species have taken the audacious tactic of using generational starships, in the hopes that their descendants will one day arrive at a new planet.

The final lines of the story have the aliens musing about the nature of human civilization and the future of the humans when they learn about the existence of other intelligent life, given their rapid advancement and apparent determination. The last sentence hints the outcome might not be  favorable to the aliens.

Reception 

Arthur C. Clarke spoke of "Rescue Party" in a foreword to the story, republished in The Sentinel, a book of short stories, in 1983:

See also

"The Fermi Paradox Is Our Business Model", 2010 Charlie Jane Anders story in which aliens arriving at post-nuclear holocaust Earth are surprised that some humans have developed the technology to survive

External links 
 
"Rescue Party" on the web

Short stories by Arthur C. Clarke
1946 short stories
Post-apocalyptic short stories
Works originally published in Analog Science Fiction and Fact
Dying Earth (genre)
Fiction about supernovae
Generation ships in fiction